North Korea participated at the 2018 Summer Youth Olympics in Buenos Aires, Argentina from 6 October to 18 October 2018.

Archery

North Korea qualified one archer based on its performance at the Asian Continental Qualification Tournament.

Individual

Team

Gymnastics

Rhythmic
North Korea qualified one gymnast based on its performance at the 2018 Asian Junior Championship.

 Girls' rhythmic individual all-around - 1 quota

Table tennis

North Korea qualified two table tennis players based on its performance at the Road to Buenos Aires (North America) series.

 Boys' singles - Kim Song-gun
 Girls' singles - Pyon Song-gyong

Weightlifting

North Korea qualified one athlete based on its performance at the 2017 World Youth Championships.

References

2018 in North Korean sport
Nations at the 2018 Summer Youth Olympics
North Korea at the Youth Olympics